The 1938 Stanford Indians football team represented Stanford University in the 1938 college football season. The team was coached by Tiny Thornhill in his sixth season at Stanford and played their home games at Stanford Stadium in Stanford, California.

Schedule

Players drafted by the NFL

References

Stanford
Stanford Cardinal football seasons
Stanford Indians football